Victor Cheng is a former McKinsey & Company management consultant, strategic planning consultant, public speaker, and author of several books on business.

He is a graduate of Stanford University with a BA in Economics and an MA in Sociology. Victor started his career as a management consultant with McKinsey & Company and later held senior management positions with Live Person and Art Technology Group (since acquired by Oracle Software).

As a business consultant, Victor advises owners and CEOs of small businesses and Inc 500 caliber companies in their corporate decision-making. He is a contributor to Entrepreneur.com and writes on topics of leadership and human capital in fast-growing small businesses. Victor also serves as an expert source for media outlets including MSNBC, Fox Business Network, TIME, Forbes, Fortune Small Business,  Inc Magazine, Entrepreneur, and The Wall Street Journal.

He is also the author of "Case Interview Secrets: A Former McKinsey Interviewer Reveals How to Get Multiple Job Offers in Consulting" and the founder of CaseInterview.com, a blog catering to aspiring management consultants. He is a frequently cited expert on the case interview, a job interview format used frequently by the management consulting industry, and serves as a commentator on the management consulting industry.

References

External links
 
 www.CaseInterview.com

McKinsey & Company people
Living people
American male bloggers
American bloggers
American commentators
Year of birth missing (living people)